Yu Junjian (born April 16, 1956) is a Chinese singer.

Biography
Yu was born in Guilin, Guangxi, in 1956. He entered Guilin Song and Dance Troupe in 1971 and he joined the Chinese People's Liberation Army Naval Song and Dance Troupe in 1979. Later, he was graduated from China Conservatory of Music and Peking University. In December 2002, he acted as chairman in China Federation of Literary and Art Circles.

Yu is actively involved in politics himself, and was a member of the 9th, 10th, 11th and 12th National Committee of the Chinese People's Political Consultative Conference.

References

Chinese male singers
Peking University alumni
China Conservatory of Music alumni
1956 births
Living people
People from Guilin